Joseph Patrick Donahue (November 6, 1870 – April 26, 1959) was an American prelate of the Roman Catholic Church who served as Auxiliary bishop of the Archdiocese of New York from 1945 to 1959.

Biography
Born in New York City, Joseph Donahue was ordained a priest for the Archdiocese of New York on June 8, 1895.

Pope Pius XII appointed him as the Titular Bishop of Emmaüs and Auxiliary Bishop of New York on January 27, 1945.  He was consecrated a bishop by Archbishop Francis Spellman on March 19, 1945. The principal co-consecrators were Bishops John O'Hara, C.S.C. of Buffalo and New York Auxiliary Bishop James McIntyre.

Bishop Donahue continued to serve as an auxiliary bishop until his death on April 26, 1959, at the age of 88.

See also

 Catholic Church hierarchy
 Catholic Church in the United States
 Historical list of the Catholic bishops of the United States
 List of the Catholic bishops of the United States
 Lists of patriarchs, archbishops, and bishops

References

External links
 Roman Catholic Archdiocese of New York

1870 births
1959 deaths
Clergy from New York City
20th-century American Roman Catholic titular bishops
People of the Roman Catholic Archdiocese of New York